Giovanni Durando (23 June 1804 – 27 May 1869) was an Italian general and politician.

Biography
Born at Mondovì, in what is now the province of Cuneo, he entered the Royal Guard corps of the Kingdom of Sardinia in 1822. In the 1830s, after having been discovered as member of a liberal plot which aimed to extort a constitution from king Charles Felix, he moved first to France and then to Belgium, where he enrolled in a foreign corps of  Belgian Revolution. Later he became officer of the constitutionalist army of Pedro IV of Portugal. In 1835 he became officer of the Hunters of Oporto Regiment. Later, he was Major General of the Papal Army, in command of a Papal division in the Veneto, where he was not able to fulfil  his task of stopping general Nugent's Austrian forces. In the same year he was appointed as Lieutenant General of the Sardinian/Piedmontese army.

He participated to all the Italian War of Independence (1848–1849, 1859 and 1866) and in the Italian Expedition in the Crimean War (1855–1856). He was wounded in  the Battle of Custoza (1866), where he was in command of the I Corps. In 1849 Durando spent a period in Sardinia where he quenched popular revolts in Sassari and in Gallura.

Durando became senator of Sardinia (later, Kingdom of Italy) in 1860. The following year he took part in the suppression of brigandage in the former Kingdom of the Two Sicilies. He died at Florence in 1869.

His brother Giacomo was also a general and senator (and fought with Giovanni in Belgium, Portugal and Spain), while another brother, Giovanni Antonio, was army general.

Sources
"Giovanni Durando" in the Enciclopedia Italiana Dizionario Biografico degli Italiani 
Page at Italian Senate website 

1804 births
1869 deaths
People from Mondovì
Italian generals
Italian people of the Italian unification
Members of the Senate of the Kingdom of Italy
Members of the Senate of the Kingdom of Sardinia
People of the First Italian War of Independence
People of the Second Italian War of Independence
People of the Third Italian War of Independence